The 1995 UST Growling Tigers men's basketball team represented University of Santo Tomas in the 58th season of the University Athletic Association of the Philippines. The men's basketball tournament for the school year 1995–96 began on July 15, 1995, and the host school for the season was the Ateneo de Manila University.

UST finished the double round-robin eliminations at first place with 11 wins against 3 losses. They fell into a two-game losing streak early in the first round, with the Ateneo Blue Eagles winning over them for the first time in the last five years, and the UE Red Warriors handing them down a 19-point 54–73 defeat. The Tigers closed out the first round with a denial of the De La Salle Green Archers' quest for an undefeated season, snapping their 6-game winning streak with a 75–59 victory. They had an average winning margin of 11.7 points and an average losing margin of 9.3 points per game.

In the Final Four, UST overcame a 65–76 loss from the No. 4-ranked FEU Tamaraws by winning 74–68 in the deciding game to qualify to the Finals, where they were once again facing La Salle in a repeat of last year's best-of-three series. The Green Archers won Game 1 by 10 points, but the Tigers once again succeeded in extending the series to a third game after a 66–62 Game 2 win. In the deciding game, Dale Singson scored the last basket with a layup in the last 9.4 seconds after driving past La Salle's Jason Webb for a 67–64 count. The Archers missed a three-point shot as time expired, giving UST their third three peat since the 1946–48 seasons.

Chris Cantonjos was named Most Valuable Player of the season, while Gerard Francisco won the Rookie of the Year award.

Roster

Depth chart

Roster changes

Subtractions

Additions

Schedule and results

Preseason tournament

UAAP games 

Elimination games were played in a double round-robin format. All games were aired on PTV 4 by Silverstar Sports.

Postseason tournament

Awards

References 

UST Growling Tigers basketball team seasons
UAAP Season 58